Gachin-e Bala (also Romanized as Gachīn-e Bālā and Gāchin Bāla; also known as Gachīn-e ‘Olyā and Gachin Olya) is a village in Gachin Rural District, in the Central District of Bandar Abbas County, Hormozgan Province, Iran. At the 2006 census, its population was 3,146, in 688 families.

References 

Populated places in Bandar Abbas County